

The DV.3 was a prototype fighter aircraft built and tested by AGO in 1915. It was a two-bay biplane of conventional configuration with a neatly cowled engine. Development was delayed by AGO's commitment to building reconnaissance aircraft, and when the DV.3 flew, its performance was found to be far lower than predicted and all further work was abandoned.

Specifications

References

 
 AGO DV.3 – airwar.ru

1910s German fighter aircraft
Aircraft first flown in 1915
DV.3